Da Capo is the fourth studio album released by Swedish pop group Ace of Base. It was released in 2002 in Europe (on Edel-Mega/Universal) and Japan (on Toshiba EMI with a different cover and additional tracks).

The album is named for the musical term da capo, meaning "back to the beginning." It was intended to be a return to the band's initial sound.

Background
The album was initially slated for a summer 2000 release, but problems with Ace of Base's record labels caused it to be delayed for another year. The band's record label demanded that many of the album's songs be reworked with additional producers.  Ultimately, Da Capo came out at the end of September 2002, and resulted in very low album sales in many European territories. The album was planned to be released in the United States in 2003, but no release surfaced.

The minimal promotion was handled by two out of the four band members, Jenny Berggren and Ulf Ekberg. Jonas Berggren wanted to stay at home with his two children and Malin Berggren only attended one performance in Germany in 2002. During promotion Jenny and Ulf visited Sweden, Denmark, Norway, Finland, Germany, Poland and Austria.

In an interview, Ulf said that the group would release the album in the United States, with the songs being more acoustic. However, it never came out in America or Australia, although it has recently become available on iTunes. Polydor Records gave it a "soft release" in the UK on 21 October 2002 with no promotion nor any radio singles as Polydor believed that the band were no longer relevant to the British music scene. The album was released with Copy Control protection in some regions.

The title track was later featured on Dance Dance Revolution Supernova in 2006. As of 2008, Da Capo has sold over 600,000 copies, far fewer than Ace of Base's earlier releases.

This is the last studio album with the original lineup to date.

Track listing

Notes
 signifies a remixer
 signifies an assistant producer
 signifies a vocal producer
 signifies a co-producer

Personnel 

Jonas "Joker" Berggren – Arranger, Producer
Britta Bergström – backing vocals 
Anoo Bhagavan – backing vocals
Tom Bohne – A&R
Mathias Bothor – Photography
Axel Breitung – Guitar, Remixing, Vocal Engineer
Thorsten Brötzmann – Keyboards
Jakob Deichmann – A&R
Tim Dobrovolny – A&R
Thomas Eberger – Mastering
Björn Engelmann – Mastering Cutting Room Studios
Fiete Felsch – Soprano saxophone
Par Lonn – Cello
Nick Nice – Programming, Multi-Instruments, Producer, Mixing
Kay Nickold – Production Assistant
Jeanette Olsson – backing vocals
Assi Roar – Bass
Pontus Söderqvist – Programming, Multi-Instruments, Producer, Mixing
Harry "Slick" Sommerdahl – Arranger, backing vocals, Producer, Vocal Producer
Jonas Von Der Burg – Arranger, Producer, Vocal Producer

Release history

Charts

Sales

Germany: 40,000 units sold
Japan: 35,000 units sold
Sweden: 15,000 units sold

DVD

The DVD contains all official Ace of Base videos released up to that point except "Travel to Romantis" and the acoustic U.S. version of "Lucky Love". It also includes the standard edition Da Capo album in 5.1 Surround Sound, a photo gallery, discography, and biographies in English and German.

Track listing

References

Ace of Base albums
2002 albums
Edel-Mega Records albums

pt:Da Capo